State Highway 125 (RJ SH 125, SH-125) is a State Highway in Rajasthan state of India that connects Bhairupura ojha in Bundi district of Rajasthan with Roteda in Bundi district of Rajasthan. The total length of RJ SH 125 is 48.50 km.

This highway connects SH-29 in Bhairupura ojha to SH-37A in Roteda.

References

State Highways in Rajasthan